Tagalag, also known as Taga-Ilog, is an administrative division in northern Metro Manila, the Philippines. It is an urban barangay in the city of Valenzuela, and is famous for fish products such as tilapia and bangus, as well as desserts such as halaya and garbanzos. It was declared as a city eco-tourism zone in 2016.

It is bounded by Polo River in the west, the Meycauayan River in the north and the Coloong river in the east.

Etymology
The name of the barangay is a combination of the Filipino words taga, meaning "belonging", and alog, which means "a pool of water in a field", owing to the flooding of the area that has formed the area's identity.

Its former name, Taga-Ilog, meaning "from the river", is a nod to the vast expanse of aquatic resources in the area brought in from the three connected rivers.

History
The flat, low-lying terrain of the CAMANAVA area in Metro Manila is an area prone to flooding. This was the case as the Tagalag area was a large rice field until strong rainfall from a typhoon in the 1970s have caused the area to flood. When the floods did not subside, the Tagalag area became a fishing site, as it attracted fish from the Polo, Meycauayan, and Colong rivers.

Festivals
Residents of Tagalag celebrate a fiesta every May 10 with a fishing contest.

Tourism
Tagalag Fishing Village, the first fishing village in the city of Valenzuela, was formally inaugurated on February 15, 2020. The fishing haven is considered to be the city's "best-kept secret”, which lies beside a 1,300-meter fenced boardwalk, with light posts, adorned with statues of fish that can be caught there. It was constructed to preserve the fishing site.

Various activities are also offered in the area such as jogging on the boardwalk, recreational fishing, line fishing tutorials, bird watching, boating, photowalk, and sunset watching. Migratory birds can also be seen in the distance in the area.

Tilapia, bangus, and hito are among the types of fish can be caught in the fishing site.

To promote responsible and sustainable tourism, accreditation and tourism standards are being maintained by the community-based tourism council. Park rangers also enforce Tagalag Linear Park rules to maintain peace and cleanliness in the village.

Accredited Establishments
 D’Cove Pavilion and Fishing Ground
 La Casa Antigo Resort
 Llenado Fishing Facility
 Sitio Rosal Pavilion 
 Boy Bartolome Fishpond
 Melandro Vergino Fishpond
 Kainan sa Palaisdaan ni Tata Celo
 Kamayan sa Palapat
 Alvarez Park Cafe
 La Casa Antigo Pavilion
 Patio Roberto
 VIP/Sunshine Payment Center

Government
The seat of government of Tagalag is located at the curve of Rosal Street and Balikatan Street, alongside the water body of the fishing village.

Recognition
Tagalag Fishing Village was among the initiatives recognized among the Top 10 Outstanding Local Governance Programs at the 2021 Galing Pook Awards, held virtually on October 20, 2021.

References

External links

Valenzuela, Philippines official site

Barangays of Metro Manila
Valenzuela, Metro Manila